Pristimantis grandiceps is a species of frog in the family Strabomantidae.

It is endemic to Colombia. Its natural habitat is tropical moist montane forests. It is threatened by habitat loss.

References

grandiceps
Amphibians of Colombia
Endemic fauna of Colombia
Amphibians described in 1984
Taxonomy articles created by Polbot